Supervision is the act or instance of directing, managing, or oversight.

Supervision may refer to:

Abusive supervision
Clinical supervision, the system whereby therapists are expected to arrange to meet another therapist for their own benefit or to discuss their work
Supervision (telephony), a type of signaling in telephony for answering and disconnecting telephone calls
Watara Supervision (also known as Quickshot Supervision in the UK), a video game system
Supervision (character), (formerly known as Scrap), a female superhero and member of Dynamo 5
SuperVision (band), the works of Richard Blake Hansen released under the Pretty Lights record label.
Supervision (album), a synth-pop record released by English artist La Roux in February 2020.

See also
 Management
Supervisor, one who oversees the work or tasks of another
Supervizion, a professional services company